Club Deportivo Caspe is a Spanish football team based in Caspe, in the autonomous community of Aragon. Founded on 13 March 1923, they currently play in Tercera División RFEF – Group 17, holding home matches at Campo de Fútbol Los Rosales, with a capacity of 1,000 seats.

Season to season

23 seasons in Tercera División
1 season in Tercera División RFEF

References

External links
  
 Fútbol Regional team profile 
 Soccerway team profile

Association football clubs established in 1923
Football clubs in Aragon
1923 establishments in Spain